Sebastião Nery is a Brazilian writer and journalist. He was born in Jaguaquara, in the state of Bahia, on March 8, 1932.

Writing career
He worked as a reporter for O Diário, a morning newspaper linked to the Archdiocese of Belo Horizonte; and for various other publications in the late 1950s before founding the weekly newspaper Jornal da Semana in 1959. He continued to write and edit for a range of print and television news outlets through the sixties and seventies.

Political career
In November 1982 and took his place in the Chamber of Deputies in February 1983. He was an presidential candidate Fernando Collor de Mello in 1989. He was then appointed cultural attaché in Rome, 1990–1991, and in Paris, 1993.

Published works

 Sepulcro caiado: o verdadeiro Juraci, 1962
 Folclore político v. l, 1973
 Socialismo com liberdade, 1974
 16 derrotas que abalaram o Brasil, 1974
 Portugal, um salto no escuro, 1975
 Folclore político v. 2, 1976
 Folclore político v. 3, 1978
 Pais e padrastos da pátria, 1980
 Folclore político v. 4, 1982
 Sibéria, Nicarágua, El Salvador e outros mundos, 1982
 Crime e castigo da divida externa, 1985
 A história da vitória: porque Collor ganhou, 1990
 A eleição da reeleição, 1999
 Grandes pecados da imprensa, 2000
 Folclore político - 1950 histórias, 2002
 A Nuvem, 50 anos de Historia do Brasil, 2009
 Ninguém Me Contou Eu Vi -  De Getúlio a Dilma, 2014

References

Brazilian male writers
Brazilian journalists
Male journalists
People from Bahia
Living people
1932 births